The Herald News is a newspaper based in Fall River, Massachusetts.

The Herald News may also refer to:

The Herald-News, based in Joliet, Illinois
Herald News, based in Woodland Park, New Jersey